Debi Ghosal (1 November 1934 – 5 August 2022) was an Indian politician. He was elected to the Lok Sabha, lower house of the Parliament of India, from Barrackpore, West Bengal as a member of the Indian National Congress, serving from 1984 to 1989. He died on 5 August 2022, at the age of 87.

References

External links
Official biography. Parliament of India

1934 births
2022 deaths
Indian National Congress politicians from West Bengal
Lok Sabha members from West Bengal
India MPs 1984–1989
Bangla Congress politicians
People from North 24 Parganas district